The Sam F. Davis Stakes is a Grade III American Thoroughbred horse race for three years old horses over the distance of  miles on the dirt scheduled annually in February at Tampa Bay Downs racetrack in Oldsmar, Florida. The event currently carries a purse of $250,000.

History
The event was named after the industrialist Sam F. Davis who in 1972 became President of the Florida Downs and Turf Club and worked to make the track successful. Davis retired in 1980 with the track renaming itself to Tampa Bay Downs.

The following year the Turf Club inaugurated the event on 28 February 1981 in honor of Sam F. Davis over the distance of one mile and seventy yards with the Robert E. Van Worp Jr. owned and the Robert E. Van Worp Sr. trained Croziers Ace defeating eight other starters with a winning margin of  lengths in a time of 1:45. Two of the starters, Ironical and Jealous Count fell when they were impeded by the second-placed finisher Rightorwron who was disqualified and placed last.

In 1982 the distance of the event was increased to  miles. The event was run in split divisions in 1984 with both winners shipping in from Miami. In 1985 the distance of the event was deceased to a seven furlong sprint before reverting to the  miles the following year.

From 1986 until 1995 the Breeders' Cup offered incentives for horses nominated to the Breeders' Cup that ran in the event and this reflected in the name of the event.

The scheduling of the Sam F. Davis has made it a logical prep race for the Grade II Tampa Bay Derby which is usually held one month after. In 1987 the winner of the event, Phantom Jet proceeded to win the Tampa Bay Derby.

The event was classified Listed for the first time in 2004 and was upgraded to Grade III in 2009 which headlines Tampa Bay Downs' Festival Preview Day.

Since 2013 the event has been part of the Road to the Kentucky Derby and frequently produces starters in that race.

Records
Speed record:
 1:42.44 – Flameaway (2018)

Largest Winning Margin:
    lengths –  San Gennaro  (1999)

Most wins by a jockey:
 4 – John R. Velazquez (2006, 2007, 2010, 2016)

Most wins by a trainer:
 7 – Todd A. Pletcher (2006, 2007, 2010, 2011, 2014, 2016, 2023)

Most wins by an owner:
 5 – WinStar Farm (2006, 2007, 2010, 2011, 2014)

Sam F. Davis Stakes – Tampa Bay Derby double:
 Phantom Jet (1987), Speedy Cure (1991), Marco Bay (1993), Thundering Storm (1996), Burning Roma (2001), Destin (2016), Classic Causeway (2022)

Winners

Notes:

§ Ran as an entry

See also
Road to the Kentucky Derby
List of American and Canadian Graded races

External links
 Tampa Bay Downs Media Guide 2021

References

Recurring sporting events established in 1981
Horse races in Florida
Tampa Bay Downs
Flat horse races for three-year-olds
Triple Crown Prep Races
Graded stakes races in the United States
Sports competitions in Tampa, Florida
1981 establishments in Florida
Grade 3 stakes races in the United States